Fernando Veneranda (23 May 1941 – 1 March 2007 in Porto San Giorgio) was an Italian football (soccer) player and manager.

Playing career
Veneranda, a forward, started his professional career for Fiorentina, where he played from 1960 to 1963. He never played a single Serie A match, but appeared in a Cup Winners' Cup match, as well as in the Coppa Italia and Mitropa Cup. He owns the record of being the Fiorentina players with the highest number of appearances without having ever played a league match. He then played for a number of Serie A, B and C clubs. Veneranda ended his playing career in 1973 for Matera, and soon became manager of the same club.

Managing career
After his time at Matera, Veneranda moved to Campobasso, Marsala, and to Palermo, a former playing club of his, at the end of the 1976/1977 season. He is best remembered among Palermo fans for having led the Serie B club to its second Coppa Italia final in history, then lost 2–1 to giants Juventus. Despite this, Veneranda coached only a single Serie A team in his whole career, Avellino; he was called to coach the biancoverdi in October 1982 and obtained a good ninth place for the small club; he was fired after the tenth matchday of the next season. Veneranda retired from football in 1992, after he relegated to Serie C1 with Messina.

Veneranda died on 1 March 2007, aged 65, in his native city of Porto San Giorgio.

References

1941 births
2007 deaths
Sportspeople from the Province of Fermo
Italian footballers
Italian football managers
Association football forwards
Serie A players
Serie B players
Serie C players
ACF Fiorentina players
A.C. Prato players
Palermo F.C. players
Brescia Calcio players
Genoa C.F.C. players
Potenza S.C. players
F.C. Matera players
Palermo F.C. managers
Hellas Verona F.C. managers
Calcio Foggia 1920 managers
U.S. Avellino 1912 managers
Cagliari Calcio managers
U.S. Triestina Calcio 1918 managers
A.C.R. Messina managers
Footballers from Marche